Kim So-hyeong (sometimes pronounced as: Kim Sohyeong; born August 22, 1965) is a South Korean voice actor who joined Seoul-based Korean Broadcasting System's voice acting division in 1992.

Role

Broadcast TV
Alien Nine (Korea TV Edition, Tooniverse)
Aria (Korea TV Edition, Animax)
Chibi Maruko-chan (Korea TV Edition, Tooniverse)
Dragon Ball Z (Korea TV Edition, KBS) 
Dragon Ball GT (Korea TV Edition, KBS) 
Fighting Spirit (Korea TV Edition, Tooniverse)
Mask Man (Original Korean TV series, KBS)
One Piece (Korea TV Edition, Animax)
Romeo's Blue Skies (Korea TV Edition, KBS) 
Slam Dunk (Korea TV Edition, SBS)
The Irresponsible Captain Tylor (Korea TV Edition, Tooniverse)
Wedding Peach (Korea TV Edition, SBS)

Movie Dubbing
The Land Before Time film series (Korea TV Edition, SBS) (Spike)
Iron Man (Korea TV Edition, KBS) (Replacing Terrence Howard)
Crash (Korea TV Edition, KBS) (Replacing Terrence Howard)
Comrades: Almost a Love Story (Korea TV Edition, KBS) (Replacing Eric Tsang)
Infernal Affairs film series (Korea TV Edition, KBS) (Replacing Eric Tsang)
Cats & Dogs (Korea TV Edition, SBS) (Replacing Sean Hayes)
Dracula 2000 (Korea TV Edition, KBS) (Replacing Omar Epps)
Dreamer (Korea TV Edition, KBS) (replacing Ken Howard)
Kung Fu Hustle (Korea TV Edition, KBS)
A Chinese Ghost Story II (Korea TV Edition, SBS)
Perhaps Love (Korea TV Edition, KBS)
Stuart Little (Korea TV Edition, KBS)

Video Games
Halo 2 - Chief Tartarus
StarCraft II: Wings of Liberty - Bailiff

References

External links
KBS Voice Acting division Kim Seo Hyeong blog (in Korean)

1965 births
Living people
South Korean male voice actors
Place of birth missing (living people)